The Chemical Pioneer Award, established in 1966, is awarded by the American Institute of Chemists to recognize chemists or chemical engineers who have made outstanding contributions to advances in chemistry or the chemical profession.

Recent recipients
Source: AIC
 2022 Alison Butler, Chi-Huey Wong
 2021  Benjamin Cravatt, Veronica Vaida, Jonathan L. Sessler
 2020  No award
 2019 William H. Starnes, Jr., Peng Chen,  Richard B. Kaner

2018   Kenneth S. Suslick (University of Illinois at Urbana-Champaign); Vicki H. Grassian (UC San Diego); Mercouri Kanatzidis (Northwestern University)
2017   Paul A. Craig (Rochester Institute of Technology); Jeffrey W. Kelly (Scripps Research Institute); Marek W. Urban (Clemson University)
2016 	Rebecca L. Cann (University of Hawaii at Manoa) ; Donna Blackmond (The Scripps Research Institute); Michael Wasielewski (Northwestern University)
2015   No award
2014   Anthony Cheetham (University of Cambridge, England) ; Ann M. Valentine (Temple University) ; Robert Langer (Massachusetts Institute of Technology)
2013   Henry F. Schaefer, III (University of Georgia) ; Thomas R. Tritton (Chemical Heritage Foundation)
2012   Robert Lochhead ; Helen Free
2011   James Christner
2010   Sossina M. Haile (Caltech)
2009   Keith Carron (University of Wyoming) ; Debashis Mukherjee (IACS)
2008   E. Gerald Meyer (University of Wyoming) ; Barnaby Munson (University of Delaware)
2007   Magid Abou-Gharbia ; Dennis Y-M Lo ; Alan G. Marshall (Florida State University)
2006   Glenn Crosby ; David Devraj Kumar (Florida Atlantic University) 
2005   Bassam Shakhashiri ; Steven L. Suib ; C.N.R. Rao
2004   Keki H. Gharda ; Eric Jacobsen ; Michael Pirrung
2002   Gerard Jaouen ; Julius Rebek
2000   Richard A. Adams ; Robert G. Bergman ; Larry Dahl ; Wilfried Mortier ; Kenner Rice

Selected earlier recipients
1999   No award
1998   John E. Bercaw ; Stephen J. Benkovic ; Albert Meyers
1997   Jerrold Meinwald
1996   K.C. Nicolaou ; Fred McLafferty	
1995   Gabor Somorjai ; Owen Webster
1994   Norman L. Allinger ; M. Frederick Hawthorne ; John D. Roberts
1993   Derek H. R. Barton ; Bruce Merrifield ; George Andrew Olah
1992   Gilbert Stork ; Fred Basolo ; Ralph F. Hirschmann
1991   Michel Boudart ; Edith M. Flanigen ; Herbert S. Gutowsky ; Jack Halpern
1990   Michael J. S. Dewar
1989   Herman S. Bloch ; Harry R. Allcock ; David R. Bryant
1988   K. Barry Sharpless; John H. Sinfelt
1987   Herbert S. Eleuterio
1986   Howard Zimmerman
1985   Otto Vogl
1984   Alan MacDiarmid ; Isabella Karle
1983   Harry G. Drickamer; William S. Knowles ; Barry M. Trost
1981   Elias James Corey
1980   Paul H. Emmett ; Stephanie Kwolek  
1979   Paul Harteck ; Barnett Rosenberg ; Leo Sternbach ; Alejandro Zaffaroni
1977   Donald F. Othmer
1976   Edwin T. Mertz
1975   Herbert C. Brown ; Rachel Fuller Brown ; Elizabeth Lee Hazen ; Linus C. Pauling
1973   Melvin A. Cook ; Paul J. Flory ; Carl Djerassi
1972   Herman Francis Mark ; Lewis Sarett
1970   Tracy Hall ; William J. Sparks
1969   Roy J. Plunkett ; Harold C. Urey
1968   Glenn T. Seaborg ; Max Tishler
1966   Eugene G. Rochow, Charles C. Price

See also
List of chemistry awards

References

American science and technology awards
Chemistry awards
Awards established in 1966